Graeme Hall, also known as The Dogfather (born 1956 in Selby, Yorkshire) is a British dog trainer, podcaster, and author.  He is the star of the television series Dogs Behaving (Very) Badly.Broadcast since 2017, it is shown on Channel 5 in the UK and on CBC in Canada.
Hall is a Master Dog Trainer and a member of the Guild Of Dog Trainers. 

In 2022, he began writing a regular column for The Times.    He also hosted a podcast, Talking Dogs,  and appeared on Mastermind and University Challenge.

Hall was a management consultant at Weetabix Limited in Northamptonshire for 20 years.

Bibliography
All Dogs Great and Small (Penguin Books, 2021) 
Perfectly Imperfect Puppy (Random House, 2022)

References

External links

Dog trainers
British columnists
British podcasters
1956 births
Living people